The 1980 Paris Open, also known that year as the Crocodile Open,  was a Grand Prix tennis tournament played on indoor hard courts. It was the 11th edition of the Paris Open (later known as the Paris Masters). It took place at the Palais omnisports de Paris-Bercy in Paris, France, from 27 October through 2 November 1980. Brian Gottfried won the singles title.

Finals

Singles

 Brian Gottfried defeated  Adriano Panatta 4–6, 6–3, 6–1, 7–6
 It was Gottfried's 9th title of the year and the 67th of his career.

Doubles

 Paolo Bertolucci /  Adriano Panatta defeated  Brian Gottfried /  Raymond Moore 6–4, 6–4
 It was Bertolucci's 2nd title of the year and the 17th of his career. It was Panatta's 3rd title of the year and the 24th of his career.

References

External links 
 ATP tournament profile